A brass catcher (also brass trap) is a device designed to capture cartridge casings, often made of brass, as they are ejected from a firearm. Various designs exist, utilizing a bag, pouch, net or box to catch the casings. Some brass catchers, whether universal or designed for a specific gun, can be attached directly to the firearm. Other larger, free-standing brass catchers may be placed to the side of the firearm.

Gallery

References

Firearms